is a passenger railway station located in the city of Mitaka, Tokyo, Japan, operated by the East Japan Railway Company (JR East).

Lines
Some Tokyo Metro Tōzai Line inter-running services also originate and terminate here. The station is 24.1 kilometers from Tokyo Station.

Station layout
The station comprises three island platforms serving six tracks, with the station building located above and perpendicular to the platforms. The station has a "Midori no Madoguchi" staffed ticket office.

Platforms

History
Mitaka Station opened on 25 June 1930. On 15 July 1949, an unmanned train, with its controls tied down, crashed into the station, killing 6 and injuring 20. The incident remains shrouded in mystery.

Passenger statistics
In fiscal 2019, the JR station was used by an average of 98,796 passengers daily (boarding passengers only) making it the 44th busiest JR East station. The daily passenger figures (boarding passengers only) in previous years are as shown below.

Surrounding area
 Tamagawa Aqueduct
 Musashino Municipal Athletic Stadium
 Musashino Sports Complex
 Musashino Chuo Park
 Mitaka City Office
 Musashino City Office
 Musashino Police Station
 Zenrinji Temple
 Inokashira Park
 Ghibli Museum

See also

 List of railway stations in Japan

References

External links

 JR East station information 

Chūō Main Line
Chūō-Sōbu Line
Stations of East Japan Railway Company
Stations of Tokyo Metro
Railway stations in Tokyo
Railway stations in Japan opened in 1930
Mitaka, Tokyo